The men's road race at the 1980 UCI Road World Championships was the 47th edition of the event. The race took place on Sunday 31 August 1980 in Sallanches, France. The race was won by Bernard Hinault of France.

Final classification

References

Men's Road Race
UCI Road World Championships – Men's road race
1980 Super Prestige Pernod